King Kauluma Village is a village situated in the Oshikoto Region at the northern part of Namibia with the population of about 4800 residents.
King Kauluma is located about 12 km from Oshivelo(Onamutoni). King Kauluma village is sandy and forested so much. All residents are Oshiwambo speaking.

History of King Kauluma
King Kauluma village was found in 1990 shortly after independence. Most of the first residents were returnees.
The returnees were initially based at the former army base used by the South African Soldiers.
Due to unemployment the returnees were assisted with small projects to help themselves like bakery and agriculture (Field Crop)
which did not last very long. The King of Ondonga, King Immanuel Kauluma then decided to give them land to do farming.
The village was then named after the king.

Initially, King Kauluma was one big village with a surface area of 84 km² (32.4 mi²). Between 2016 and 2019 the village was sub-divided in several smaller villages. They were named King Kauluma A, B, C, D, E and F each with its own headman or headwoman.

Educational Section
Most of the residents are not educated as they were PLAN fighters and did not get access to education.
Currently there are two schools. One of the schools is in King Kauluma A while the other is in King Kauluma F. School children still walk vast distances (in excess of 5km one way) to reach either school.

Health services
There is not a health clinic at King Kauluma village but residents get medical assistance at nearest clinic at Oshivelo.

Development
An agricultural extension office is operational providing extension work and advisory services. Services range from information sharing, seed distribution, project site visits, coaching, etc.   

No pipelines pass by or close to the village meaning there is a need of clean water in these villages. Currently residents use boreholes. Government of Namibia has started with plans to extend a pipe line from Omutsegonime to King Kauluma. In 2022 some field work was started to conduct surveys of household units, inhabitants, livestock and horticultural activities in the area to serve as input into the project.

References

Populated places in the Oshikoto Region
Populated places established in 1990